The Romance in F minor, Op. 11, (B. 39) is a single-movement work for violin and orchestra by Antonín Dvořák, published in 1879.

History
It was written at the request of Josef Markus, leader of the Provisional Theatre Orchestra in Prague; he would play it at the annual concert of the orchestra at Žofín Palace. It was first performed at the concert, conducted by Adolf Čech, on 9 December 1877.

Dvořák based the work on the slow movement, marked Andante con moto quasi allegretto, of his String Quartet No. 5 in F minor. This quartet was composed in 1873 when the composer was not widely known; it was unperformed and unpublished in his lifetime.

He wrote a version of the Romance in F minor with piano accompaniment, dedicated to the violinist František Ondříček, which was not published in his lifetime. The orchestral version, and an arrangement for violin and piano (B. 38) made by Dvořák's friend , were published in 1879 by Simrock.

Structure
The work is scored for two flutes, two oboes, two B clarinets, two bassoons, two horns, strings, and solo violin; its duration is about 12 minutes.

The movement, in F minor, is marked Andante con moto. It is in sonata form: a graceful melody, from the String Quartet No. 5, leads to a theme in a contrasting key, of similar character, followed by a more restless theme and eventually to an episode of strident chords from the orchestra; the original calm mood prevails and the themes return; the work ends in F major.

Discography
 Itzhak Perlman, Boston Symphony Orchestra, Seiji Ozawa, Sony CD (1994) and Kultur DVD (2007)

References

External links

Compositions by Antonín Dvořák
Compositions for violin and orchestra
Compositions in F minor
1879 compositions
Romance (music)
Compositions for violin and piano